Vair may refer to:
 Vair, a heraldic tincture
 Vair (river), a tributary of the Meuse in Lorraine, France
 Vair, Texas, a town in the United States
 Guillaume du Vair (1556–1621), French author and lawyer
 Steve Vair (1886–1959), Canadian professional ice hockey player
 V Air, a Republic of China's low-cost airline based in Taipei, Taiwan.